The Valech Report (officially The National Commission on Political Imprisonment and Torture Report) is a record of abuses committed in Chile between 1973 and 1990 by agents of Augusto Pinochet's military regime. The report was published on November 29, 2004 and detailed the results of a six-month investigation. A revised version was released on June 1, 2005. The commission was reopened in February 2010 for eighteen months, adding more cases.

The commission found that 38,254 people had been imprisoned for political reasons and that most had been tortured. It also found that thirty people "disappeared" or had been executed in addition to those recorded by the earlier Rettig Report.

Testimony has been classified, and will be kept secret for the next fifty years, until 2054. Therefore, the records cannot be used in trials concerning human rights violations, in contrast to the "Archives of Terror" in Paraguay and Operation Condor. Associations of ex-political prisoners have been denied access to the testimony.

Commission

The report was prepared at the request of President Ricardo Lagos by the eight-member National Commission on Political Imprisonment and Torture headed by Bishop Sergio Valech and was made public via the Internet. The commission included: María Luisa Sepúlveda (executive vice president), lawyers Miguel Luis Amunátegui, Luciano Fouillioux, José Antonio Gómez Urrutia (PRSD president), Lucas Sierra, Álvaro Varela and psychologist Elizabeth Lira. It did not include any representative of the victims or members of the associations of ex-political prisoners. The Commission coordinated its work with all regional and national organizations of former political prisoners, and human rights organizations, to help contact their members, and others to give testimony. Advertisements were broadcast on national and local radio and television stations and published in national and local newspapers. The number of individuals testifying is consistent with the geographic distribution of inhabitants in the capital city and the provinces.

Findings

First part
The initial report was based on testimony given to the commission by 35,865 people, of which 27,255 were regarded as "direct victims". Of these, 94% said they were tortured. Eleven people were born in prison, and ninety-one underage children were detained with their parents (including four unborn babies); these were not considered "direct victims". Another group of 978 people were minors at the time of their arrest. Four women were pregnant at the time of their arrest and were tortured; their children were considered "direct victims". A child who was the result of a rape while in prison was also considered a "direct victim". Victims were detained for six months, on average.

Out of the more than 8,600 rejected cases, 7,290 people requested that their cases be revised. The commission also agreed to investigate a further 166 cases which were not considered the first time around. The updated report added 1,204 new cases, bringing the total number of victims to 28,459. The total number of arrests was 34,690; some people were detained multiple times.

The commission found that approximately 69% of arrests occurred between September 11 and December 31 of 1973, and 19% between January 1973 and August 1977.

Second part
Under the presidency of Michelle Bachelet the commission was reopened. It reviewed about 32,000 new requests from February 2010 to August 2011. It was to be open for twelve months but due to the high number of requests it was extended for an additional six months. 9,795 cases of torture and thirty cases of disappearances or executions were certified. The new report was presented to President Sebastián Piñera on August 18, 2011 and released on August 26, 2011.

Benefits
The state provided lifelong monetary compensation to the victims as well as health and education benefits. These are detailed in Law 19,992 and include: a monthly payment of about 113,000 to 129,000 thousand Chilean pesos (in December 2004 prices, subsequently adjusted for inflation), depending on the victim's age; free public healthcare for victims and their parents, spouses or children under twenty-five, or incapacitated children of any age; free education (primary to tertiary) for victims whose studies were interrupted by their imprisonment.

There is also a special bonus of four million Chilean pesos for victim's children who were born in captivity or who were detained with their parents while they were minors.

Criticism

Critics of the Valech Report said that families were falsely claiming that their relatives went missing during the 1973–1990 military regime. There had been reports since 2008 that four people, listed as killed or missing, were alive or had died in unrelated circumstances. These cases have raised questions about the system of verification of victims of dictatorships. The Age newspaper has reported that a total of 1,183 people were killed, or reported missing and presumed dead, and that their names appear on a special memorial at the General Cemetery of Santiago. Clive Foss, in The Tyrants: 2500 years of Absolute Power and Corruption, estimates that 1,500 Chileans were killed or disappeared during the Pinochet regime. Nearly 700 civilians disappeared during the period between 1974  and 1977 after being detained by the Chilean military and police. In October 1977, The New York Times reported that Amnesty International had documented the disappearance of approximately 1,500 Chileans since 1973.

According to the associations of ex-political prisoners, the commission used a different definition of torture than the one accepted by the United Nations. Most of those new cases of child victims had not been included in the first report because their parents were either executed political prisoners or among the "disappeared" detainees and there were no confirming witnesses. About two-thirds of the cases of abuse that were recognized by the commission took place during 1973.

The associations say that testimony was accepted under the following conditions:

 Detention had to have lasted for more than five days. For perspective, in Santiago de Chile, 120,000 people were detained by the armed forces in 1986. Of those, 24,000 were detained by the Carabineros Chilean police force for a duration of four and a half days. However, the Commission's requirement was not about the length of detention, but about the political motivation for the detention or torture. In those cases where evidence of either was found, even if the period of detention was of few days, the testimony of those individuals was accepted (see article 1, paragraph 2 of Supreme Decree 1,040 of 2003, that created the Commission and established its mandate ).
 Detention must have been in one of the 1,200 official detention or torture centers listed by the Commission including: Villa Grimaldi, Colonia Dignidad, Víctor Jara Stadium or the Esmeralda floating center. Cases of torture in the streets or in vehicles were excluded. Starting in the 1980s, the CNI (which succeeded DINA) no longer took victims to detention centers thus, say the associations, the fact that about two-thirds of the cases of abuse that were approved by the commission took place during 1973. The case of Carmen Gloria Quintana, who was burnt alive in the middle of the 1980s, was not recognized, following this definition of torture. Some have disputed this, pointing out that there was no official list of detention centers where victims had to have been detained for their cases to be recognized. The list established by the Commission was the product of the testimony received. The difficulty in accepting testimony from people detained in vehicles or tortured on the street was in finding enough evidence to support their cases.  Those cases where evidence was found of people being detained and tortured in police buses or other vehicles were accepted. Ms. Quintana contacted the Commission but did not testify before it.
 Detention must not have taken place in any country other than Chile. The associations underlined the fact that the commission worked for only six months, with very little publicity, despite the UN's demand that it accept testimony for a longer period. In some cases, in rural areas, victims who knew about the Commission had to give testimony to local civil servants who were part of the local governments when they were detained and tortured. When the Commission knew about this situation, it demanded the exclusion of those officers from the process and sent new teams to those areas. The commission worked only during office hours, forcing victims to ask their employer for permission to testify. Insufficient psychological assistance was provided to the victims who had to relive their experiences, some of them suffering flashbacks, except referring statement givers to the Comprehensive Health Care Reparations Program (PRAIS), and some specialized mental health care NGOs were unable to meet the demand thus "re-victimizing" those individuals. Ex-political prisoners said that testimony from minors under eighteen years of age was refused because it was impossible for them to recall exactly the details of the place and time where they had been tortured. Children, some of them five years old, and adolescents, had been tortured by the dictatorship.

Sixty percent of the ex-political prisoners were unemployed for at least two years according to studies made by ex-political prisoners' associations. Their life expectancy is only sixty to sixty-five years. Switzerland and Argentina have recently refused to extradite two ex-political prisoner to Chile, on the grounds that they might be subject to "mistreatment" in Chile.

Judgment
Until May 2012, seventy-six agents had been condemned for human rights violations and sixty-seven were convicted: thirty-six from the Army, twenty-seven Carabineros, two from the Air Force, one from the Navy, and one of the PDI. Three condemned agents died and six agents received conditional sentences. The Chilean justice system holds 350 open cases of "disappeared" persons, illegal detainees, and torture victims during the dictatorial rule. These cases involve 700 military and civilian personnel.

See also

 Chilean coup of 1973
 Rettig Report
 List of truth and reconciliation commissions
Popular Declassification (Desclasificacion Popular) An initiative in Chile to encourage those who testified for the Valech Commission to go to court to declassify their personal files.

References

External links
Documents of the report in PDF format 
Government page of the report 
Chile torture victims win payout (BBC)
Chile's torture victims to get life pensions (The Guardian)
Interview with the president of the Association of Relatives of Executed Political Prisoners in Chile
Asociación Chilena de Ciencia Política
Human Rights Watch - Chile
Memoriaviva 

2004 in Chile
Military dictatorship of Chile (1973–1990)
Dirty wars
Government reports
Operation Condor
Political repression in Chile
Truth and reconciliation commissions
2004 documents
Truth and reconciliation reports
Presidency of Ricardo Lagos